The Ten Commandments (Italian: I dieci comandamenti) is a 1945 Italian drama film directed by Giorgio Walter Chili. It features an ensemble of Italian actors in episodes based on the Ten Commandments.

It was made during the German occupation of Rome, which brought a halt to all ongoing work at Italian film studios. Only two films made with Vatican support went into production at the time, providing employment for actors and technicians. The other film was Vittorio De Sica's The Gates of Heaven. Their work on the films enabled them to refuse demands that they relocate north to work in the Venice-based film industry of the puppet Italian Social Republic. The lengthy production process meant that it wasn't released until long after Rome had been liberated by Allied forces.

Cast
 Marina Berti as (segment "Non desiderare la roba d'altri")  
 Carlo Campanini as (segment "Non desiderare la roba d'altri")  
 Delia Brandi as (segment "Non desiderare la roba d'altri")  
 Amedeo Nazzari as (segment "Non desiderare la donna d'altri")  
 Germana Paolieri as (segment "Non desiderare la donna d'altri")  
 Elisa Cegani as (segment "Non dire falsa testimonianza") 
 Claudio Gora as (segment "Non dire falsa testimonianza")  
Assia Noris as (segment "Non rubare")  
 Otello Toso as (segment "Non rubare")  
 Carlo Romano as (segment "Non rubare") 
 Rossano Brazzi as (segment "Non commettere atti impuri")  
 Loretta Lisi as (segment "Non commettere atti impuri")  
 Roldano Lupi as (segment "Non ammazzare")  
 Delia Orman  as (segment "Non ammazzare")  
 Nino Pavese as (segment "Non ammazzare")  
 Aldo Silvani as (segment "Non ammazzare")  
 Vera Carmi as (segment "Onora il padre e la madre")  
 Ada Dondini as (segment "Onora il padre e la madre")  
 Ugo Sasso as (segment "Onora il padre e la madre")  
 Cesco Baseggio as (segment "Onora il padre e la madre")  
 Luigi Pavese as (segment "Onora il padre e la madre")  
 Bella Starace Sainati as (segment "Onora il padre e la madre")  
 Massimo Girotti as (segment "Ricordati di santificare le feste")  
 Mariella Lotti as (segment "Ricordati di santificare le feste")  
 Valentina Cortese as (segment "Non nominare il nome di Dio invano")  
 Andrea Checchi as (segment "Non nominare il nome di Dio invano")  
 Adele Garavaglia as (segment "Non nominare il nome di Dio invano")  
 Carlo Ninchi as (segment "Io sono il Signore Dio tuo")  
 Bianca Manenti as (segment "Io sono il Signore Dio tuo")  
 Ciro Berardi 
 Lorena Berg 
 Elvira Betrone 
 Arturo Bragaglia 
 Ennio Cerlesi 
 Giorgio De Lullo 
 Dino Di Luca 
 Franca Dominici 
 Mario Ferrari 
 Guido Garavaglia 
 Fedele Gentile 
 Loris Gizzi 
 Giovanni Grasso 
 Nino Marchesini 
 Maria Marengo
 Guido Notari 
 Amalia Pellegrini 
 Amilcare Pettinelli 
 Giuseppe Porelli 
 Franco Pucci 
 Gina Ror  
 Giovanna Scotto 
 Carlo Tamberlani 
 Amedeo Trilli

References

External links 
 

1945 drama films
Italian drama films
1945 films
1940s Italian-language films
Films directed by Giorgio Walter Chili
Films based on the Book of Exodus
Italian black-and-white films
1940s Italian films